Castillo de Salobreña is located in Salobreña, in the province of Granada, Spain. The existence of a known fortification in Salobreña dates from the 10th century. The current structure which was built during the Nasrid dynasty. Trapezoidal in shape, it has four towers. It was declared a Bien de Interés Cultural monument in 1993.

External links

 "El Castillo de Salobreña (Granada) en Época Medieval" (The Castle of Salobreña, Granada, in Medieval Period) by José Mª GARCÍA 

Bien de Interés Cultural landmarks in the Province of Granada
Castles in Andalusia